Jaime Velayo Ongpin (June 15, 1938 – December 7, 1987) was Minister of Finance of the Philippines under President Cory Aquino, appointed in 1986 after having played an instrumental role in her campaign. Ongpin was the younger brother of Roberto Ongpin who had been Minister of Trade and Industry under President Ferdinand Marcos.

Ongpin was a 1958 graduate of the Ateneo de Manila University and from Harvard Business School in 1962. He had been advertising manager of the Philippine subsidiary of Procter & Gamble. In 1962, he joined the Benguet Corporation, one of the country's leading gold mining companies. In 1974, he became company president.

He committed suicide on December 7, 1987 at age 49, just three months after having been dismissed from the government on September 14, in a cabinet reorganization that followed a military coup attempt.

His wife Isabel was quoted as saying: "He had been depressed about infighting in Aquino's cabinet and disappointed that the 'People Power' uprising which had toppled dictator Ferdinand Marcos had not brought significant change".

He was portrayed by Noel Trinidad in the 1988 People Power Revolution movie A Dangerous Life.

References

1987 deaths
20th-century Filipino economists
Secretaries of Finance of the Philippines
Ateneo de Manila University alumni
Harvard Business School alumni
1938 births
Suicides by firearm in the Philippines
Burials at the Manila North Cemetery
Corazon Aquino administration cabinet members
Individuals honored at the Bantayog ng mga Bayani
Filipino politicians of Chinese descent